Jody Danagher is a retired Irish rugby player. He played as a tighthead prop-forward for UL Bohemian, Cork Constitution and Munster. He retired in 2006.

References

Irish rugby union players
Munster Rugby players
UL Bohemians R.F.C. players
Cork Constitution players
Living people
Year of birth missing (living people)